Trnovec pri Slovenski Bistrici is a small village in the Municipality of Slovenska Bistrica in northeastern Slovenia. The area is part of the traditional region of Styria. It is now included with the rest of the municipality in the Drava Statistical Region.

References

External links
Trnovec pri Slovenski Bistrici at Geopedia

Populated places in the Municipality of Slovenska Bistrica